Thadist B. Christopher (December 24, 1912 – January 28, 1973) was an American Negro league outfielder in the 1930s and 1940s.

A native of Tampa, Florida, Christopher made his Negro leagues debut in 1935 with the New York Black Yankees. He went on to play through 1945, including a stint with the Homestead Grays during their 1943 Negro World Series championship season. In 1944, Christopher slugged a ball completely out of the Polo Grounds. He died in Los Angeles, California in 1973 at age 60.

References

External links
 and Baseball-Reference Black Baseball stats and Seamheads
 Thadist Christopher at Negro League Baseball Players Association

1912 births
1973 deaths
Baltimore Elite Giants players
Cincinnati Clowns players
Cleveland Buckeyes players
Homestead Grays players
New York Black Yankees players
Newark Eagles players
Baseball outfielders
20th-century African-American sportspeople